Turbonilla joelleae is a species of sea snail, a marine gastropod mollusk in the family Pyramidellidae, the pyrams and their allies.

Description
The shell grows to a length of 5.5 mm.

Distribution
This marine species occurs off New Caledonia and the Solomons.

References

External links
 To Encyclopedia of Life
 To World Register of Marine Species

joelleae
Gastropods described in 2010